Lira is the name of several currency units. It is the current currency of Turkey and also the local name of the currencies of Lebanon and of Syria. It is also the name of several former currencies, including those of Italy, Malta and Israel. The term originates from the value of a Roman pound (about 329g, 10.58 troy ounces) of high purity silver. The libra was the basis of the monetary system of the Roman Empire. When Europe resumed a monetary system, during the Carolingian Empire, the Roman system was adopted. The Roman denominations  librae, solidi, denarii were used (becoming known in England as £sd).

Particularly this system was kept during the Middle Ages and Modern Age in England, France, and Italy. In each of these countries the libra was translated into local language: pound in England, livre in France, lira in Italy. The Venetian lira was one of the currencies in use in Italy and due to the economic power of the Venetian Republic a popular currency in the Eastern Mediterranean trade.

During the 19th century, the Ottoman Empire and the Eyalet of Egypt adopted the lira as their national currency, equivalent to 100 piasters or kuruş. When the Ottoman Empire collapsed in years 1918–1922, many among the successor states kept the lira as their national currency. In some countries, such as Cyprus, which have belonged to both the Ottoman Empire and the British Empire, the words lira and pound are used interchangeably.

Lira sign 

For the Turkish lira, the Turkish lira sign is used.

The Maltese lira used  before 1986 and  thereafter (both as prefixes), though £M continued to be used in unofficial capacities.

The Unicode system allocated  to the Lira, to provide compatibility with a legacy HP character set.

Current uses

Turkey
The Turkish lira was introduced in 1844 during the Ottoman reign. The Turkish lira is now the currency of Turkey and the Turkish Republic of Northern Cyprus, and used in Turkish-occupied northern Syria.

Lebanon and Syria
The Lebanese pound and Syrian pound are both called "lira" in Arabic, the national language of both Lebanon and Syria.

Historic use

Italy

The lira was the currency of Italy from its unification until it was merged into the euro in 1999.  A unit of currency lira had previously been used in some of the states and possessions that became Italy but their values were not necessarily equivalent. (See Luccan lira,  Papal lira, Parman lira, Sardinian lira and Tuscan lira.)

Former currencies named lira
 Cypriot lira/pound 1879–2007; merged into the euro, 2008
 French livre 781–1794; became the French franc
 Israeli lira/pound 1948–1980; replaced by the old shekel in 1980.
 Italian lira 1861–2002; merged into the euro, 1999 (notes and coins from 2002)
 Italian East African lira 1938–1941; supplanted by the East African shilling
 Italian Somaliland lira 1925–1926; replaced by the Italian East African lira
 Luccan lira until 1800 and 1826–1847; merged into the Italian lira
 Maltese lira 1825–2007; merged into the euro, 2008
 Neapolitan lira 1812–1813; merged into the Italian lira
 Ottoman lira 1844–1923; became the Turkish lira
 Papal lira 1866–1870; became the Vatican lira at par with the Italian lira
 Parman lira before 1802 and 1815–1859; merged into the Italian lira
 Sammarinese lira 1860s–2002; merged into the euro
 Sardinian lira 1816–1861; merged into the Italian lira
 Tripolitanian lira 1943–1951; replaced by the Libyan pound
 Tuscan lira until 1807 and 1814–1826; merged into the Italian lira
 Vatican lira 1929–2002; merged into the euro
 Venetian lira 1472–1807; merged into the Italian lira

See also
 Pound (currency), the linguistic equivalent of the word "lira" in English.
 Lira sign, which varies by currency, as does its status

Further reading
Carlo M. Cipolla, Le avventure della lira, Bologna, Il Mulino, 1975.
Stefano Poddi, "La lunga storia della lira", stralcio, Fondazioni, n. 2 marzo-aprile, 2008. Roma.
Stefano Poddi, "La lunga storia della lira", articolo completo, Difesa e Lavoro'', settembre 2008.

References

External links

Overview of Italian lira from the BBC

Currencies of Europe
Currencies of Italy
Currencies of Malta
Currencies of San Marino
Currencies of Vatican City